π Sculptoris, Latinized as Pi Sculptoris, is candidate astrometric binary star system in the southern constellation Sculptor, positioned near the eastern constellation border with Fornax. It has an orange hue and is dimly visible to the naked eye with an apparent visual magnitude of 5.25. Based upon parallax measurements, the system is located at a distance of 66 light years from the Sun, and is drifting further away with a radial velocity of +14 km/s.

The visible component is an aging giant/bright giant star with a stellar classification of K1II/III. It is a red clump giant, which indicates it is on the horizontal branch and is generating energy through core helium fusion. The star has 1.5 times the mass of the Sun and 9.3 times the Sun's radius. It is radiating 41 times the luminosity of the Sun from its swollen photosphere at an effective temperature of 4,800 K.

References

K-type bright giants
K-type giants
Horizontal-branch stars
Astrometric binaries

Sculptor (constellation)
Sculptoris, Pi
CD-32 666
010537
007955
0497